Charles Louis Gabriel (25 June 1857 – 10 February 1927) was an Australian photographer and medical practitioner. He was born in Kempsey, a remote New South Wales settlement, to Dr. Charles Gabriel and Emma Rudder. Despite his upbringing in this remote colonial and coastal fringe, like his father and grandfather before him, Louis became a physician. At Scotland's prestigious Edinburgh University he won additional medical qualification in surgery and maternity, with distinction. On his return voyage, he probably practiced his new skills as a ship's doctor. After practicing briefly in Sydney, he left for Gundagai, an inland pastoral town halfway between Sydney and Melbourne, in 1887.

The new doctor dedicated himself to medical work, only taking up the hobby of photography twelve years later, around 1899. Over the following decade or so he produced over eight hundred glass plate negatives, many of the images astonishing and accomplished. Now in the National Library of Australia (NLA), they are a valued record of Australia—and Gundagai, its most iconic town.   
Contemporary documentaries and articles present his photographs as acutely observed documentary images. However, he has been quaintly portrayed as a typical, country medico, a gentleman and talented amateur. But his imagery and his story belie it.

Family heritage 

The Gabriel family heritage is French, English, West Indian and Welsh. However, the doctor's negroid features made him something of an 'odd man out' in colonial Australia, then in the process of creating its White Australia policy. He was commonly described as 'the black doctor'. His African forebears, in four successive generations were dispersed around four continents. As a dark skinned doctor in Nineteenth and early Twentieth century Gundagai, most commentators have underplayed or ignored this aspect. Yet race and colour was always going to be important in a colonial Australia engaged in debate on nation and identity.

Generations of the Gabriels, and millions of Africans, had already felt the effects of slavery and dislocation. Ironically the French revolution's cry for 'Liberty, Equality and Fraternity' meant that a few thousand talented Africans became unwitting participants in the Napoleonic wars and Napoleonic France. Over time, these outcasts of France developed strategies for coping with the racial suspicions and hostilities faced in everyday life. Accomplished black professionals like the Gabriel family, sought acceptance through their strength, work, good deeds, local familiarity and importantly, longevity of residence in a single location.

Historical backdrop 

Louis Gabriel's life also coincided with a crucial period when Gundagai was cemented into the Australian mythology through stories, poetry, events and reportage. He lived there when the town asserted itself, perhaps vaguely at first, to be typically Australian: democratic, equal, rugged and practical.

Career 

He practiced in Gundagai from 1887 to his death in 1927. He became Gundagai Hospital's chief (and sole) medico in 1889. The 1890s depression hit the subscription-based funding of the hospital, and several disputes with the Management Committee led to his sacking. It was another five years before he regained the position, after an extended period of bitter conflict with fellow doctor and rival to the hospital position, Dr O'Dwyer. Louis Gabriel held this position until his death in 1927.

Curiously his position as Government Medical Officer from 1893 had a profound influence on him. He championed the causes of Modern Medicine, not through surgery - his specialty - but through community and public health. He keenly, and to his cost, persistently advocated improved hygiene standards in food and water, in the maintenance of private and public spaces, and actions in the prevention of major diseases. He particularly campaigned for the introduction of reticulated water supplies, and greatest of all, construction of a new Gundagai Hospital based on modern medical principles. Noteworthy too was his demand that people of all races be equally treated in Gundagai Hospital, this at a time when Aboriginal people
were largely forbidden town access.

Louis Gabriel was Catholic. His marriage to Jessie Walton in 1892 appears to have been short-lived.

Death 

On his death Louis Gabriel's photographs were stored away and largely forgotten until the 1950s. As an important town in the Australian mythology, Gabriel's photographs were reproduced in local booklets on Gundagai's history from the 1950s. In the 1970s the images, then held by Cliff Butcher and Oscar Bell, were donated to the National Library of Australia.  The town also has a small museum dedicated to him.

With the National Library's publication of The Gundagai Album in 1978, there was a new focus on his photographs. Many reviewers noted their certain style, a way of seeing and organizing people time and place. They were personalized, sometimes reflective, often with a strong sense of the documentary observation informed by his medical training. They also made distinctive use of the photographer's shadow and the camera's wide-angle lens, often giving them a sense of paradoxical separation from the subjects and  secretive involvement.

Several television programs followed, an entry in the Bicentennial Biography, and other publications. In 2007, a novel, Belonging, was written by G. McDougall on the doctors life and times. The novel integrated Gabriel's photographs into the body of the story.

References 

 The Gundagai Album, National Library of Australia, 1976.
 Tales of Old Gundagai, Books 1 and 2, Oscar Bell. Gundagai Historical Society, c.1980.
 
 Belonging, A Photo Novel, G. McDougall. Hightor Press, 2007. Ebook available at https://www.facebook.com/Belonging4

1857 births
1927 deaths
People from New South Wales
Australian photographers
Gundagai